The Amalgamated Engineering Union (AEU) was a major British trade union. It merged with the Electrical, Electronic, Telecommunications and Plumbing Union to form the Amalgamated Engineering and Electrical Union in 1992.

History
The history of the union can be traced back to the formation of the Journeymen Steam Engine, Machine Makers' and Millwrights' Friendly Society, in 1826, popularly known as the "Old Mechanics". They invited a large number of other unions to become part of what became the Amalgamated Society of Engineers (ASE).

In 1920, the ASE put out a fresh call for other unions to merge with it in a renamed Amalgamated Engineering Union (AEU). Seventeen unions balloted their members on a possible merger, and nine voted in favour of amalgamation:

 Amalgamated Association of Brass Turners, Fitters, Finishers and Coppersmiths
 Amalgamated Instrument Makers' Society
 Amalgamated Society of General Tool Makers, Engineers and Machinists
 East of Scotland Brass Founders' Society
 London United Metal Turners', Fitters' and Finishers' Society
 North of England Brass Turners', Fitters' and Finishers' Society
 Steam Engine Makers' Society (SEM)
 United Kingdom Society of Amalgamated Smiths and Strikers
 United Machine Workers' Association

The resulting union had a membership of 450,000, about 300,000 coming from the ASE.

In 1922 employers, represented by the Engineering Employers' Federation, launched an industry-wide lockout in an attempt to reverse the gains made by the AEU during WWI and its aftermath. Exploiting the downturn in economic conditions in the engineering industry, they demanded the union forfeit control over overtime. The lockout lasted from 11 March to 13 June and involved 260,000 workers, 90,000 of them represented by the AEU. The lockout ended with the union conceding some of the employers' demands.

The AEU continued to grow and absorb smaller unions. From 1926, it accepted members who had not completed an apprenticeship. In 1933, it had 168,000 members, and 390,900 by the end of the decade. Its largest membership growth came during the Second World War when its all-male membership voted to admit women for the first time and 100,000 joined almost immediately, membership reaching 825,000 by 1943. It admitted women due to the increasing role of female industrial workers in the British home front, as well as to prevent either female workers joining rival unions or non-union female workers from undercutting union wages. However, the AEU also lost its overseas branches in Australia, New Zealand, and South Africa, which became independent unions.

From the 1940s, the AEU also absorbed various smaller unions: the Amalgamated Society of Glass Works Engineers, Amalgamated Society of Vehicle Builders, Carpenters and Mechanics, Amalgamated Machine, Engine and Iron Grinders' and Glaziers' Society, Leeds Spindle and Flyer Makers' Trade and Friendly Society, United Operative Spindle and Flyer Makers' Trade and Friendly Society, and the Turners', Fitters' and Instrument Makers' Union.

The AEU merged with the Amalgamated Union of Foundry Workers (AUFW) on 1 January 1968 to form the Amalgamated Union of Engineering and Foundry Workers (AEF), and with the Draughtsmen and Allied Technicians' Association (DATA) and Constructional Engineering Union in 1971 to form the Amalgamated Union of Engineering Workers (AUEW). The union was now organised on a federal basis, with four sections: Engineering, Foundry, Construction, and Technical, Administrative and Supervisory (TASS). This approach was not a success, as the various sections fell into dispute with each other. In 1984, the Engineering, Foundry and Construction Sections were merged and in 1986 adopted the name Amalgamated Engineering Union once more, while the TASS remained separate and, in 1988, it became entirely independent of the union once more.

Despite this series of amalgamations, declines in the number of workers in heavy industry saw membership drop from a peak of 1,483,400 in 1979, to 858,000 in 1986. The AEU became a mainstay of the moderate right in the trade union movement through the 1980s and 1990s, leading the manufacturing unions in 1989–1991 in a successful push for a shorter working week, but failing to merge with a number of unions, notally the Union of Construction, Allied Trades and Technicians.

In 1992 the AEU finally achieved a merger with the Electrical, Electronic, Telecommunications and Plumbing Union, EETPU, after a hundred years of off and on discussions. The new union took the name Amalgamated Engineering and Electrical Union.

Elections results
Like the ASE before it, the AEU affiliated to the Labour Party, sponsoring candidates at each election, many of whom won seats in Parliament.

Leadership

General Secretaries
AEU
1921: Albert Smethurst
1933: Fred A. Smith
1943: Benjamin Gardner
1956: Cecil Hallett
1965: Jim Conway
AEF/AUEW

AEU
1988: Gavin Laird

Presidents
1920: James Thomas Brownlie
1931: William Harold Hutchinson
1933: John C. Little
1939: Jack Tanner
1953: Robert Openshaw
1956: William Carron
1968: Hugh Scanlon
1978: Terry Duffy
1986: Bill Jordan

References

External links
Catalogue of the AEU, AEF, and AUEW archives, held at the Modern Records Centre, University of Warwick
Catalogue of further AUEW archives, held at the Modern Records Centre, University of Warwick
Catalogue of the AUEW Construction Section archives, held at the Modern Records Centre, University of Warwick
Catalogue of the AEF/AUEW Foundry Section archives, held at the Modern Records Centre, University of Warwick

 
Defunct trade unions of the United Kingdom
Engineering trade unions
1920 establishments in the United Kingdom
Trade unions established in 1920
Trade unions disestablished in 1992
Trade unions based in London